WHSR may refer to:

 White House Situation Room
 WTPA (AM), a radio station in Pompano Beach, Florida, United States, which used the call sign WHSR from 1997 to 2021